Dirty Bass is the fourth studio album by American hip hop group Far East Movement, released through Cherrytree Records and Interscope Records (Universal Music Group) on June 12, 2012. Despite having two top 40 hit singles, the album received mixed success worldwide.

The songs "Like a G6" and "Rocketeer" from their 2010 album Free Wired were included on international versions of Dirty Bass.

Singles
 "Live My Life" was released as the album's lead single on February 28, 2012. It features Justin Bieber. The song peaked to #21 in the United States, #7 in the United Kingdom, and #4 in Canada.
 "Lights Out (Go Crazy)" digitally as a single was released on March 13, 2012 through Roxbury SARL under exclusive license to Interscope Records. It is a collaboration with French producer, DJ and remixer Junior Caldera and English singer-songwriter Natalia Kills. It was included on the deluxe edition of Dirty Bass.
 "Dirty Bass" was released as the album's second single on May 10, 2012. It features Young Money rapper Tyga. Uncredited additional vocals in the chorus were provided by Kayla Kayla.
 "Turn Up the Love" was released as the album's third single on June 21, 2012. It features Cover Drive. It has so far peaked #8 in New Zealand, #8 in Australia, #12 in the Netherlands, #13 in the UK, and #14 in Ireland.
 "Change Your Life" was released as the album's fourth single on November 20, 2012. It features DJ and producer Sidney Samson and rapper Flo Rida. It was included on the re-release of Dirty Bass.
 "Get Up (Rattle)" was released as a single on December 11, 2012 through Ministry of Sound. It is a vocal version of the Bingo Players song "Rattle".
 "The Illest" was released digitally as a single on July 2, 2013, and included on the Special Edition of Dirty Bass. It features Mad Decent artist Riff Raff.

Promotional singles
 "Ain't Coming Down" was released on May 12, 2012 as a radio single from the album. The radio version features actress Susannah Wetzel (who was uncredited) in place of Matthew Koma and was slightly different from the album's version. It had achieved strong airplay mostly in Aruba, Bahamas, Belize, Honduras, Jamaica, Panama, Saint Lucia and Trinidad and Tobago.
 "Little Bird" was released on October 17, 2012 as the first promotional single from the album. A video for the song was published to YouTube through the group's Vevo channel on the same day. Produced by label executive Martin Kierszenbaum (a.k.a. Cherry Cherry Boom Boom), it features a sample of Canadian singer and songwriter Feist's "Caught a Long Wind", from her 2011 album Metals.
 "For All" was released on October 25, 2012 as the second promotional single from the album. The main theme of the song, as well as its music video, was inspired by the "Hope Is for All" (Forward) campaign, a part of President Barack Obama's re-election campaign in 2012.
 "Lovetron" was released on April 19, 2013 as the third promotional single from the album. It features American recording artist and former NLT member Travis Garland. A live acoustic performance of the song was posted to YouTube through Vevo on April 24.

Other notable songs
 The track "Candy", featuring Pitbull, was originally featured on the original motion picture soundtrack of the 2012 film Project X (via Cherrytree Records / Interscope Records).
 The international deluxe edition includes the track "Monsuno", which is the theme song from the animated series of the same name.
 The track "Lovetron" serves as a deluxe edition bonus track to the album and features Travis Garland of NLT.

Track listings
All songs written and composed by Jae Choung, James Roh, Kevin Nishimura and Virman Coquia. Additional writers noted below.

International edition

Special edition

Sample credits
 "Fly with U" contains elements of "L'Amour Toujours", as composed by Gigi D'Agostino, Carlos Montagner, Paolo Sandrini, Diego Leoni
 "Change Your Life" contains elements of "All Around the World", as composed by Ian Devaney, Andy Morris, Lisa Stansfield
 "Little Bird" incorporates a sample from "Caught a Long Wind" by Feist

Chart performance

Release history

References

External links
 

2012 albums
Far East Movement albums
Cherrytree Records albums
Interscope Records albums
Albums produced by Bangladesh (record producer)
Albums produced by Dallas Austin
Albums produced by Martin Kierszenbaum
Albums produced by RedOne
Albums
Interscope Geffen A&M Records albums